The Quinze-Vingts National Ophthalmology Hospital (Centre hospitalier national d’ophtalmologie des Quinze-Vingts) is France's national ophthalmology hospital located in Paris, in the 12th arrondissement. The hospital gave its name to the Quinze-Vingts quarter.

History 
The Hospice des Quinze-Vingts, a hospital for the blind, was founded in 1260 by Louis IX, king of France, also known as "Saint Louis". It was constructed on a piece of land called "Champ-Pourri", an area lying a short distance west of the Louvre fortress, outside the fortified wall built by Philippe Augustus from 1190 to 1209. It became included within the city after the erection of the new fortified wall of Charles V built between 1356 and 1383. Within the new neighborhood thus formed west of the Louvre, it was located on rue Saint-Honoré at the corner of the rue Saint-Nicaise, (in the area between the Palais-Royal and Place du Carrousel, whose construction post-dated of several centuries that of the Quinze-Vingts).

The name Quinze-Vingts, which means three hundred (15 × 20 = 300), comes from the vigesimal (based on 20) numeral system used in the Middle Ages: it referred to the number of beds in the hospital, and was intended to house 300 poor, blind city-dwellers.

In 1779, during the reign of king Louis XVI, the Cardinal de Rohan transferred the hospital to its current location, rue de Charenton, in the former barracks of the "Black Musketeers", (Mousquetaires noirs, named for the color of their horses), which had been disbanded in 1775. Rohan also changed the system of administration and increased the number of beds to eight hundred.

In 1801, during the Consulate, the hospital was housing the Institute for the Young Blind founded by Valentin Haüy in 1784.

Between 1957 and 1968, large parts of the former barracks of Black Musketeers were demolished. What was left - entrance and chapel - was classified Monument historique (historical monument) on 26 December 1976.

Up to this day the Quinze-Vingts remains a hospital for eye diseases. It also houses the Vision Institute (Institut de la Vision), an ophthalmology research center that opened in 2008.

Bibliography
Zina Weygand, The Blind in French Society from the Middle Ages to the Century of Louis Braille, Stanford University Press, 2009

References

External links 
 Official Web Site (in French)

History of ophthalmology
Eye hospitals
Hospitals in Paris
Louis IX of France